Angela Rawlings (known as a rawlings) is a Canadian poet, editor, and interdisciplinary artist who uses many spectacular languages for her material.

Career 
In 2001, rawlings received the bpNichol Award for Distinction in Writing when she graduated from York University. From 2001 to 2011, she worked with several Canadian arts organizations, including The Mercury Press, The Scream Literary Festival, Sumach Press, Word: Canada's Magazine for Readers + Writers, and The Lexiconjury Reading Series. In 2005, Rawlings hosted the poetry documentary series Heart of a Poet. She is also co-editor of Shift & Switch: New Canadian Poetry (The Mercury Press, 2005), an anthology featuring over forty emerging poets.

As an arts educator, rawlings has led creative writing workshops for Ryerson University, terminus1525.ca, Learning through the Arts, League of Canadian Poets, Ontario Arts Council's Artists in Education Program, the Toronto District School Board, Writers in Electronic Residence, the Toronto Public Library system, the State Library of Queensland (Australia), Menningarverkefnið Hlaðan (Vogar, Iceland), Reykjavík UNESCO City of Literature (Reykjavík, Iceland), and NTNU (Trondheim, Norway). She has co-facilitated workshops with Ciara Adams, Julie Lassonde, and Nilan Perera.

Rawlings' first book, Wide slumber for lepidopterists was published in spring 2006 by Coach House Books. In November 2006, Theatre Commutiny staged a full-length performance of the book as part of Harbourfront Centre's Hatch: Emerging Performance Projects series; Rawlings performed in and co-produced the show. In April 2007, Wide slumber for lepidopterists received a nomination for the Gerald Lampert Award for Best First Book of Poetry. The book was also awarded Alcuin Award for Book Design, and was listed in The Globe and Mail'''s top 100 books of 2006. In Autumn 2008, Belgian composer Sebastian Bradt created a choral score entitled X Our Rotten Beauties that uses text from Wide slumber for lepidopterists. In 2014, Icelandic composer Valgeir Sigurdsson via record label Bedroom Community and in collaboration with VaVaVoom Theatre Company created a full-length music theatre performance of the book, which debuted at the Reykjavík Arts Festival.

Rawlings has also worked in theatre, music, and dance. She taught ballroom, Latin, and swing dances from 2001-3. In 2005, she co-produced On the Money for Toronto's Fringe Festival, a play awarded the festival's Patron's Pick. She has also worked with Toronto's Theatre Gargantua, was on the board of directors for bluemouth inc. from 2008 to 2010, and is the president for Susanna Hood's hum dansoundart board of executives. rawlings has collaborated with improvising musicians and dancers such as Joe Sorbara and Jonathon Wilcke; sound poets such as Jaap Blonk and Paul Dutton; and the Logos Foundation's invisible and robotic instruments. She was a member of Christine Duncan's Element Choir and Nýlókórinn. rawlings is a co-member of Völva (with Maja Jantar) and Moss Moss Not Moss (with Rebecca Bruton).

Rawlings has been involved in several interdisciplinary collaborations. In 2010, rawlings lent voice to bluemouth inc.'s New York City production of The Sea Museum. In 2010 and 2011, bluemouth inc. joined rawlings to present an original work called The Centre for Sleep and Dream Studies for The Scream Literary Festival and Rhubarb Theatre Festival at Buddies in Bad Times, both in Toronto. From 2009 to 2011, rawlings developed drift with Nilan Perera and Julie Lassonde, which was performed in Toronto and Calgary. 

In 2008, Rawlings received the Chalmers Arts Fellowship; this enabled her to spend 2009 and 2010 living and working in Belgium, Canada, and Iceland. In 2011, Rawlings was the artistic director of the International Poetry Festival in Reykjavík. In 2012, Rawlings was selected to hold the position of Queensland Poet-in-Residence; during her tenure, she spent three months travelling throughout Queensland, Australia to give performances, run workshops, offer manuscript consultations, and develop the transdisciplinary digital project Gibber.Rawlings holds an MSc in Environmental Ethics and Natural Resource Management from the University of Iceland and a PhD in Theatre and Performance Studies at the University of Glasgow.

Bibliography

Anthologies
 131.839 slög með bilum. Helsinki: Ntamo, 2007 (includes translated excerpt from WSfL).
 A Global Visuage. Vienna: ch edition, 2012 (contributor).
 A Sing Economy. New York: Film Forum Press, 2008 (contributor with François Luong).
 Af steypu. Reykjavík: Nýhil, 2009 (includes excerpt from ljóðapoems).
 Desire, Doom, & Vice, a Canadian Collection. Stratford: Wingate Press, 2005 (contributor).
 I'll Drown My Book: Conceptual Writing by Women." Los Angeles: Les Figues Press, 2012 (includes excerpt from Rule of Three).
 New Icelandic Poetry in Translation. Toronto: BookThug, 2009 (includes translated excerpt from EFHILMNORSTUVWY).
 Pissing Ice: An Anthology of 'New' Canadian Poets. Toronto: BookThug, 2004 (contributor).
 Regreen: New Canadian Ecological Poetry. Sudbury: Your Scrivener Press, 2009 (includes excerpt from EFHILMNORSTUVWY).
 Shift & Switch: New Canadian Poetry. Toronto: Mercury Press, 2005, second printing (editor).
 Strong Words: Year Two. Toronto: Indiepolitik, 2007 (contributor).
 The Common Sky: Canadian Writers Against the War. Toronto: Three Squares Press, 2002 (contributor).

Books
Sound of Mull. Glasgow: Laboratory for Aesthetics and Ecology, 2019 (author).
 si tu. Zagreb: MaMa, 2017 (author).
 o w n. Vancouver: CUE Books, 2015 (author with Heather Hermant and Chris Turnbull).
 Wide slumber for lepidopterists. Toronto: Coach House Books, 2006, third printing (author).

Chapbooks
 The Great Canadian. Buffalo: Low Frequency Press, 2015 (author with Chris Turnbull).
 ljóðapoems. Edmonton: Olive Reading Series, 2008 (author).
 W I D E R: B-sides, rarities, and remixes. New York City: belladonna*, 2006 (author).
 [a,r] [s'c]. Calgary: housepress, 2002 (co-written with Stephen Cain).

Digital Publications
 Jöklar. 2014 (author).
 RUSL. 2014 (author).
 Figure: A Poetry Oracle. 2014 (co-author with Sachiko Murakami).
 Gibber. Queensland Poetry Residency, 2012 (author, designer).

Education

 2015-2019 Ph.D. University of Glasgow. Dissertation: Performing Geochronology in the Anthropocene: Multiple Temporalities along North Atlantic Foreshores.
 2011-2014 M.Sc. University of Iceland. Major: Environmental Ethics and Natural Resource Management.
 1997-2001 B.A. (Hons) York University. Major: Creative Writing. Minor: Fine Arts Cultural Studies.

External links
 a.rawlings' official website
 Wide slumber for lepidopterists
 a.rawlings' blog as Queensland Poet-in-Residence

1978 births
Living people
21st-century Canadian poets
21st-century Canadian women writers
Canadian women poets
Interdisciplinary artists
Place of birth missing (living people)